St Catherine's Church  is an Anglican Church and the parish church of Draughton. It is a Grade II* listed building and stands in the village of Draughton.

There is no reference to a church or priest in the entry for the parish in the Domesday Book, which was compiled in 1086. This may indicate the absence of a church building at that stage or, alternatively, only the absence of a resident priest.

The main structure of the present building was erected in the 12th and 13th centuries. The chancel was remodelled in about 1885. The church consists of a nave, north and south aisles, chancel and west tower. A detailed description appears on the Historic England website

The parish registers survive from 1559 and, apart from those currently in use, are kept at Northamptonshire Record Office. Details of its location and opening times can be found on the Record Office website.

Draughton is part of a united Benefice along with Faxton, Lamport, and Maidwell. Except for Faxton, each parish retains its own church building.

Notes

12th-century church buildings in England
13th-century church buildings in England
Grade II* listed churches in Northamptonshire